Vincent Stanton may refer to:
 Vincent John Stanton, English missionary
 Vincent Henry Stanton, professor of divinity